Ako Abdul-Samad (born July 25, 1951) is the Iowa State Representative from the 34th District. He has served in the Iowa House of Representatives since 2007. Previously, he was a member of the Des Moines school board. Abdul-Samad was born, raised, and resides in Des Moines.

Abdul-Samad is the founder and CEO of Creative Visions Human Development Institute, a nonprofit organization in Des Moines.

, Abdul-Samad serves on the Iowa House Administration and Rules, Education, Human Resources, and Public Safety committees. He also serves on the Health and Human Services Committee of the Midwestern Legislative Conference of the Council of State Governments.

Abdul-Samad is founder and president of the African-American Islamic Association.

Electoral history
*incumbent

Voting History
During the legislative session of 2017, Abdul-Samad voted against cutting $70.1 million from the Department for the Blind, the College Student Aid Commission, the Department of Education, and the Board of Regents.

References

External links 

 Abdul-Samad official Iowa General Assembly site
 Ako Abdul-Samad State Representative official constituency site
 Ako for Iowa official campaign site
 

1951 births
Living people
Politicians from Des Moines, Iowa
Democratic Party members of the Iowa House of Representatives
African-American Muslims
African-American state legislators in Iowa
21st-century American politicians
21st-century African-American politicians
20th-century African-American people